The Curtis M. Phillips Center for the Performing Arts is a performing arts theatre in Gainesville, Florida, United States. It is located on the western side of the University of Florida campus. This facility presents some of the most established and emerging national and international artists on the main stage. In all, the Phillips Center consists of a 1,700-seat proscenium hall and a 200-seat Black Box Theatre.
In 2000, retired Jacksonville surgeon Curtis M. Phillips provided The Barbara J. and Curtis M. Phillips M.D. Endowment Fund to name the performing arts center.

Performances
Since opening its doors in January 1992 with three sold-out performances of Cats, the Phillips Center has hosted performers as diverse as Tony Bennett, Itzhak Perlman, Riverdance, Dame Kiri Te Kanawa, Ray Charles, Alvin Ailey American Dance Theater, Alison Krauss, Stomp, Yo-Yo Ma, David Sedaris, Bolshoi Ballet, Wynton Marsalis, Jerusalem Symphony Orchestra and Capitol Steps.  In recent years, the Phillips Center has hosted world premieres and been home to productions of Aeros and the People of the Forest as they mounted new, collaborative works.

See also
University of Florida
Buildings at the University of Florida

External links
 University of Florida Performing Arts
 Virtual tour of the Center for the Performing Arts
 Gainesville Sun info about the facility

1992 establishments in Florida
Buildings at the University of Florida
Performing arts centers in Florida
Theatres completed in 1992
Theatres in Florida
Tourist attractions in Gainesville, Florida
University and college arts centers in the United States
University and college buildings completed in 1932